Nakol  is a village in the administrative district of Gmina Osiek, within Staszów County, Świętokrzyskie Voivodeship, in south-central Poland.

The village has a population of  68.

Demography 
According to the 2002 Poland census, there were 77 people residing in Nakol village, of whom 54.5% were male and 45.5% were female. In the village, the population was spread out, with 24.7% under the age of 18, 39% from 18 to 44, 16.9% from 45 to 64, and 19.4% who were 65 years of age or older.
 Figure 1. Population pyramid of village in 2002 — by age group and sex

Former parts of village — physiographic objects 
In the years 1970 of last age, sorted and prepared out list part of names of localities for Nakol, what you can see in table 3.

References

Nakol